The 1999 Georgia Tech Yellow Jackets football team represented the Georgia Institute of Technology in the 1999 NCAA Division I-A football season. The team's coach was George O'Leary. It played its home games at Bobby Dodd Stadium in Atlanta.

Schedule

Rankings

References

Georgia Tech
Georgia Tech Yellow Jackets football seasons
Georgia Tech Yellow Jackets football